Axinellida is an order of demosponges in the subclass Heteroscleromorpha. The order contains the families Axinellidae, Heteroxyidae, Raspailiidae, and Stelligeridae.

References 

  Morrow, C.; Picton, B.; Erpenbeck, D.; Boury-Esnault, N.; Maggs, C.; Allcock, A. (2012). Congruence between nuclear and mitochondrial genes in Demospongiae: A new hypothesis for relationships within the G4 clade (Porifera: Demospongiae). Molecular Phylogenetics and Evolution, 62(1), pages 174-190.,

External links 
 

 
 Axinellida at the World Register of Marine Species (WoRMS)

Heteroscleromorpha
Sponge orders